[also read as Flower in Hell] is Eiko Shimamiya's second single produced by I've Sound and Geneon Entertainment. It was released on August 22, 2007. It was able to reach #12 in the Oricon weekly charts making this Eiko's most successful single. It has sold more than 34,000 copies and stayed in the charts for 15 weeks. The title track was used as the opening theme for the anime series, Higurashi no Naku Koro ni Kai, which is the sequel to the anime Higurashi no Naku Koro ni.

Track listing 

 – 5:01
Composition: Tomoyuki Nakazawa
Arrangement: Tomoyuki Nakazawa, Takeshi Ozaki
Lyrics: Eiko Shimamiya
 – 4:39
Composition: Eiko Shimamiya
Arrangement: SORMA No.1
Lyrics: Eiko Shimamiya
 – 5:01
 – 4:37

References

2007 singles
Eiko Shimamiya songs
Song recordings produced by I've Sound
2007 songs